Harold Andrew Brown (12 January 1930 – 30 March 2002) was a Canadian radio and television host, who was associated with the Canadian Broadcasting Corporation. He was one of the original hosts of As It Happens from 1968 to 1974, and subsequently became host of Metro Morning on CBL in Toronto.

On CBC Television, he was a cohost of Take 30 and Marketplace. He also hosted Speaking Out, a popular phone-in show on TVOntario during the 1980s.

His daughter, Robin Brown, is also a CBC broadcaster, who hosted the sports program The Inside Track.

Brown was born in St. John's, Newfoundland in 1930. He died in that city following heart surgery in 2002.

References

External links
CBC: As It Happens 35th anniversary special highlights
Province of Newfoundland and Labrador, House of Assembly Proceedings, 18 April 2002, includes tribute to Brown

1930 births
2002 deaths
Canadian television hosts
People from St. John's, Newfoundland and Labrador
Canadian talk radio hosts
CBC Television people
Journalists from Newfoundland and Labrador